James Forrest (31 March 1927 – 26 November 1992) was a Scottish footballer, who played for Motherwell (making over 300 appearances), Stenhousemuir and Scotland. He was born in Bothwell.

References

External links 

1927 births
1992 deaths
Footballers from South Lanarkshire
Association football inside forwards
Scottish footballers
Motherwell F.C. players
Stenhousemuir F.C. players
Scottish Junior Football Association players
Scotland international footballers
Scottish Football League players
People from Bothwell